Hamus is a genus of spiders in the family Nesticidae. It was first described in 2015 by Ballarin & Li. , it contains 5 species.

References

Nesticidae
Araneomorphae genera
Spiders of Asia